Benedetta Ceccarelli (born 23 January 1980, in Perugia) is an Italian athlete who specializes in the 400 metres hurdles.

Biography
She won two medals, to individual level, at the International athletics competitions. Her personal best time is 54.79 seconds, achieved in August 2005 in Rieti.

Achievements

National titles
Benedetta Ceccarelli has won 6 times the individual national championship.
6 wins in the 100 metres hurdles (2004, 2005, 2006, 2007, 2008, 2009)

See also
 Italian records in athletics
 Italian all-time lists - 400 metres hurdles

References

External links
 

1980 births
Living people
Italian female hurdlers
Athletes (track and field) at the 2004 Summer Olympics
Olympic athletes of Italy
Sportspeople from Perugia
Mediterranean Games gold medalists for Italy
Athletes (track and field) at the 2005 Mediterranean Games
Universiade medalists in athletics (track and field)
Mediterranean Games medalists in athletics
Universiade silver medalists for Italy
Athletics competitors of Centro Sportivo Carabinieri
Medalists at the 2005 Summer Universiade
20th-century Italian women
21st-century Italian women